The Assinica National Park Reserve is a protected area located in west-central Quebec, Canada. This  territory, set aside in 2011, aims to protect one of the most important habitats of endangered species such as woodland caribou, forest ecotype, as well as the bald eagle in the wildlife. Regarding the flora, two species likely to be threatened or vulnerable were observed in this reserve: the hudsonia tomentosa and the arethusa bulbosa.

See also 
 National Parks of Quebec
 Oujé-Bougoumou
 Jamésie

Notes and references 

Protected areas of Nord-du-Québec
National parks of Quebec
Jamésie